Eugene Spiro, born Eugen Spiro (April 18, 1874 in Breslau, Silesia – September 26, 1972 in New York City) was a German and American painter.

He was born to a Jewish family in Breslau. In 1904 Spiro was briefly married to the famous actress Tilla Durieux, who later married the important art dealer Paul Cassirer. His younger sister was the painter Baladine Klossowska. The French painter Balthus was his nephew.

References

External links 
 

19th-century German painters
19th-century American male artists
German male painters
Jewish painters
20th-century German painters
20th-century American male artists
American male painters
20th-century American painters
German Jews
Jewish emigrants from Nazi Germany to the United States
People from the Province of Silesia
Artists from Wrocław
1874 births
1972 deaths
Recipients of the Order of Merit of the Federal Republic of Germany